Randolph Mantooth is a graduate of the American Academy of Dramatic Arts, Mantooth has been a working actor in television, documentaries, theatre, and film for more than 40 years.  He was discovered in New York by a Universal Studios talent agent while performing the lead in the play Philadelphia, Here I Come.  After signing with Universal and moving to California, he slowly built up his resume with work on such dramatic series as Adam-12 (1968), Marcus Welby, M.D. (1969), McCloud (1970), and Alias Smith and Jones (1971).

He was chosen to play a lead role as Fireman/Paramedic John Gage in the 1970s medical drama, Emergency!, a show that enjoyed six seasons (129 episodes) and seven two-hour television movie specials.  Since this experience, Mantooth has spoken regularly at Firefighter and EMS conferences and symposiums across the United States, while maintaining an active acting career. He is a spokesperson for both the International Association of Firefighters [IAFF] and the International Association of Fire Chiefs [IAFC] for fire fighter health and safety, and he has been honored over the years with numerous awards and recognitions.

Mantooth has appeared in numerous films and television series in lead and supportive roles including mini-series adaptations of Testimony of Two Men (1977) and a starring role as Abraham Kent in The Seekers (1979–80). Through the 1990s and 2000s he explored a new direction in his career with daytime soap operas, earning him four Soap Opera Digest Award nominations.  He has frequently returned to his theater roots in such productions as "Footprints in Blood", "Back to the Blankets", "Wink Dah", "The Independence of Eddie Rose", "The Paper Crown", "The Inuit" and "Rain Dance", among others.

Filmography

Television

Film

Theatre 
Mantooth has frequently returned to his theatre roots in such productions as Footprints in Blood, Back to the Blankets, Wink Dah, The Independence of Eddie Rose, The Paper Crown, The Inuit and Rain Dance (off-Broadway), among others. Since 2003, Mantooth has been an Associate Artist of The Purple Rose Theatre Company in Chelsea, Michigan, founded by Jeff Daniels, completing a three-month run of Superior Donuts in 2012.

References

External links 
 Randolph Mantooth Official Website
 

Mantooth, Randolph
Mantooth, Randolph